Retiro is a district located at the southeast of the city centre of Madrid, Spain.

History
Retiro's history has been strongly determined by the presence of the park with the same name and the railway facilities located at the south and west of this District.

Retiro Park, together with Paseo del Prado, has given its own personality to the area of Los Jerónimos, while the rest of the District is determined by Atocha Railway Station and previously also by Niño Jesús Station.

During the 20th Century, the area consolidated as residential areas for people with a growing economic power.

Geography

Subdivision
The district is administratively divided into six wards (Barrios):

 Adelfas
 Estrella
 Ibiza
 Jerónimos
 Niño Jesús
 Pacífico

See also
 Buen Retiro Park, largest urban park in Madrid
 Colegio Santa María del Pilar, a private school in the district

References

External links

 
Districts of Madrid